KQKX (106.7 FM) is a radio station broadcasting a Country format. Licensed to Norfolk, Nebraska, the station transmits at 100,000 watts. KQKX has a large footprint, serving all of northeastern Nebraska, reaching south along the I-80 corridor, west towards Ord, Nebraska, and east along the Missouri River valley and north, into portions of southeast South Dakota.

The station is currently owned by WJAG, Inc.

History

KQKX was first licensed, as WJAG-FM, in 1971. On September 10, 1979 the call letters were changed to KEXL, and the station aired a Hot Adult Contemporary format known as "106.7 The X". On November 18, 2009 the call sign was changed to KQKX. The former call letters were transferred to a new KEXL in Pierce, Nebraska on 97.5 FM.

References

External links

 FCC History Cards for KQKX (covering 1967-1980 as WJAG-FM / KEXL)

QKX
Country radio stations in the United States